St James-the-Less is a church in Bethnal Green, London, England. It is an Anglican church in the Diocese of London.

Built as a commissioners' church in 1840–2, its architect was Lewis Vulliamy.

Notable clergy
 From 1906 to 1908, Frank Buttle was the Assistant Curate.
 John Watts Ditchfield was Vicar from 1908 at least before being appointed first Bishop of Chelmsford in 1914.
 From 1999 to 2006, Rachel Treweek was the Vicar; she is now Bishop of Gloucester, the first woman to become a diocesan bishop in the Church of England

References

See also
List of Commissioners' churches in London

Bethnal Green
Commissioners' church buildings
19th-century Church of England church buildings
Romanesque Revival church buildings in England
Diocese of London
Bethnal Green